Syl is a given name, typically but not always a shortened form of Sylvia, Sylvester, Sylvain, and Sylvanus. Notable people with the name include:

Syl Anderton, British motorcycle dealer and racer
Syl Apps (1915–1998), Canadian pole vaulter and hockey player
Syl Apps, Jr. (born 1947), Canadian hockey player
Syl Apps III (born 1976), American hockey player
Syl Cheney-Coker (born 1945), Sierra Leonean poet, novelist, and journalist
Syl Johnson (born 1936), American blues and soul singer
Syl Johnson (baseball) (1900–1985), American baseball pitcher
Syl Simon (1897–1973), American baseball player

See also
 Cyl (disambiguation)